Roy D'Arcy (born Roy Francis Giusti; February 10, 1894 – November 15, 1969) was an American film actor of the silent film and early sound period of the 1930s noted for his portrayal of flamboyant villains. He appeared in 50 different films between 1925 and 1939, such as The Temptress in 1926 with actresses such as Greta Garbo.

Finishing his film career around the age of 45, D'Arcy retired to his own real estate business. He died in 1969 and was buried at Montecito Memorial Park in Colton, California.

Partial filmography

 Pretty Ladies (1925) - Paul Thompson
 The Merry Widow (1925) - Crown Prince Mirko
 Graustark (1925) - Dangloss
 The Masked Bride (1925) - Prefect of Police
 La Bohème (1926) - Vicomte Paul
 Monte Carlo (1926) - Prince Boris
 Beverly of Graustark (1926) - General Marlanax
 The Gay Deceiver (1926) - Count de Sano
 Bardelys the Magnificent (1926) - Comte de Chatellerault
 The Temptress (1926) - Manos Duras
 Valencia (1926) - Don Fernando
 Winners of the Wilderness (1927) - Capt. Dumas
 Frisco Sally Levy (1927) - I. Stuart Gold
 Lovers (1927) - Señor Galdos
 On Ze Boulevard (1927) - Counnt de Guissac
 Adam and Evil (1927) - Mortimer Jenkins
 The Road to Romance (1927) - Don Balthasar
 Riders of the Dark (1928) - Eagan
 The Actress (1928) - Gadd
 Forbidden Hours (1928) - Duke Nicky
 Beware of Blondes (1928) - Harry
 Domestic Meddlers (1928) - Lew
 Beyond the Sierras (1928) - Owens
 The Last Warning (1928) - Harvey Carleton
 Girls Gone Wild (1929) - Tony Morelli
 The Woman from Hell (1929) - Slick Glicks
 The Black Watch (1929) - Rewa Ghunga
 Romance (1930) - Minor Role (uncredited)
 The Gay Buckaroo (1931) - Dave Dumont
 Discarded Lovers (1932) - Andre Leighton
 The Shadow of the Eagle (1932, Serial) - Gardner
 File 113 (1932) - De Clameran
 Love Bound (1932) - Juan de Leon
 Broadway to Cheyenne (1932) - Jess Harvey
 Sherlock Holmes (1932) - Manuel Lopez (uncredited)
 The Whispering Shadow (1933) - Professor Alexis Steinbeck
 Flying Down to Rio (1933) - One of the Three Greeks #1
 Orient Express (1934) - Josef Grunlich
 Sing and Like It (1934) - Mr. Gregory - Leading Man in Show
 Kentucky Blue Streak (1935) - Harry Johnson
 Outlawed Guns (1935) - Jack Keeler
 Captain Calamity (1936) - Samson
 Revolt of the Zombies (1936) - Gen. Mazovia
 Captain Calamity (1936) - Samson
 Hollywood Boulevard (1936) - The Sheik
 Under Strange Flags (1937) - Captain Morales
 The Legion of Missing Men (1937) - Shiek Ibrahim-Ul-Ahmed
 The Story of Vernon and Irene Castle (1939) - Actor in 'Patria' (uncredited)
 Chasing Danger (1939) - Corbin (final film role)

References

External links

 
 
 Roy D'Arcy at Virtual History

1894 births
1969 deaths
American male film actors
American male stage actors
American male silent film actors
Male actors from San Francisco
20th-century American male actors
American real estate brokers
American expatriates in France